James or Jim McAllister or McAlister may refer to:

 James G. McAllister (1861?–1933), American rancher, miner, and politician
 Jim McAllister (1944–2013), Northern Irish activist and politician
 James McAlister (1951–2018), American football player
 Jimmy McAlister (born 1957), American soccer player
 Jamie McAllister (born 1978), Scottish footballer 
 Jim McAlister (born 1985), Scottish footballer
 Jim McAllister, lead character in the 1999 American film Election
 James McAlister, American drummer and record producer